Karen Voight (born 1955) is an American fitness expert. She has produced approximately 30 exercise videos, a book, Voight: Precision Training for Body and Mind, and a health column in the Los Angeles Times.

Voight began to study ballet at age 3. In 1980 she started teaching an exercise class at Dupree Dance Academy, in West Hollywood. In 1982 she started her fitness business. By 1997 the business included seven exercise videos, mail-order sales of videos and exercise equipment, a product endorsement, a book, an exercise studio in Santa Monica, personal training, international workshops, appearances and products at Nordstrom stores, and a deal with AOL to participate in the fitness site Thrive.

Voight's ability to create and sell fitness trends was one of her strengths, according to the Los Angeles Times, including high-impact aerobics, cardiofunk and city jam (low-impact aerobics), and spinning. She received the awards "IDEA Fitness Instructor of the Year" in 1992 and "IDEA Businessperson of the Year" in 1994.

Voight produced, filmed, starred in, and edited six of her first seven videos. She costarred in the exercise video "Your Personal Best With Elle Macpherson" (1994) and consulted with Paula Abdul on her dance workout videos. Voight's many videos teach exercises from strength and cardiovascular training to yoga and Pilates.

References

External links

1955 births
American exercise instructors
Place of birth missing (living people)
American exercise and fitness writers
American columnists
Living people